The NCAA Division I FBS rushing leaders are career, single-season, and single-game leaders in rushing yards and rushing touchdowns. These lists are dominated by more recent players for several reasons:
 Since 1955, seasons have increased from 10 games to 11 and then 12 games in length.
 The NCAA didn't allow freshmen to play varsity football until 1972 (with the exception of the World War II years), allowing players to have four-year careers.
 Bowl games only began counting toward single-season and career statistics in 2002. This affects many players from before that time period, most notably Ron Dayne.

Only seasons in which a team was considered to be a part of the Football Bowl Subdivision are included in these lists. All records are current as of the end of the 2022 season.

Rushing Yards
The NCAA recognizes San Diego State's Donnel Pumphrey as the career leading in rushing yards. Pumphrey set the record in the fourth quarter of his final game, the 2016 Las Vegas Bowl, ending with 6,405 total yards. However, this is controversial as Wisconsin's Ron Dayne actually rushed for 7,125 in his career, but all 4 of Dayne's seasons came before the NCAA recognized bowl statistics as part of season and career totals. Thus, Dayne finishes 8 yards short of Pumphrey when Dayne's bowl statistics are not included, but Pumphrey's are. This has been seen as controversial by many fans and writers, who feel that the NCAA should count all pre-2002 bowl statistics as official if post-2002 ones are. Dayne himself congratulated Pumphrey but agreed that counting Pumphrey's bowl stats but not his own was unfair.

Additionally, Pittsburgh's Tony Dorsett would be ahead of Pumphrey if his bowl statistics were counted.

The single-season record holder is Oklahoma State's Barry Sanders, whose record of 2,628 does not include his bowl statistics. If they were included, it would bring his total to 2,850.

The single-game rushing record belongs to Oklahoma's Samaje Perine, whose 427 yards in a 2014 game against Kansas broke a record set just the week before by Wisconsin's Melvin Gordon. Prior to Perine and Gordon, the only player to rush for 400 yards in a game was LaDainian Tomlinson.

The only player on any of the three lists who is not a running back is Navy's Malcolm Perry, who rushed for 2,017 yards in the 2019 season. The career leader in rushing yards by a quarterback is Navy's Keenan Reynolds, who rushed for 4,559 yards in his career. The single-game leader is Arizona's Khalil Tate, who rushed for 327 yards in a 2017 game against Colorado.

Rushing Touchdowns
The career leader in rushing touchdowns is Navy's Keenan Reynolds, whose 88 career touchdowns passed a record previous held by Montee Ball. The single-season record was set by Barry Sanders in 1988, and Howard Griffith and Jaret Patterson share the single-game record with 8.

There are several quarterbacks on the lists, which are shown shaded in light blue.

References

Rushing leaders